Elsie Jane Wilson (7 November 1885 – 16 January 1965) was a cinema actress, director, and writer during the early film era. She took part in the productions of the silent film era and starred in over thirty films. Between the years of 1916 and 1919, Wilson was credited for producing, writing two films, and directing eleven films. She was best known in the genres of dramas and comedy dramas.

Biography
Elsie Jane Wilson was born in Sydney, Australia. She began her career as a  professional actress at the age of two. She credited her success to participating in the English Christmas Pantomime every year, allowing her to gain training and experience for the pictures. 

Wlison acted in London, South Africa, and New York City. She toured Australia and New Zealand with a number of J. C. Williamson companies, where she met and married Rupert Julian in 1906. They immigrated to New York, United States in 1913 and eventually found work as actors in Hollywood under Joseph de Grasse.

Film career 
Wilson and Rupert moved to Los Angeles in 1914 to pursue Universal Studios’ Rex Company. She briefly worked with The Little Theatre before she went into the movies. Wilson starred in films that were directed, produced and co-starred by her husband, Rupert Julian. She mentioned that her and Julian appeared in everything together until they came to the US. They started working on different movies and she even adds that when she was starring in “Everywomen” she went without seeing her husband for two years. The industry turned to directing, with Wilson later functioning as Julian's co-director. Though she received little credibility for her work and often was out-shined by Julian. Wilson notes that she and her husband had different ideas while sharing the appreciation for the same pictures, making it difficult for them to discuss work.

Wilson took a break from Universal and starred in films from other studios including American Studios. She appeared in Oliver Twist (1916) and other Paramount movies, then in 1917 returned to Universal and started her producer/directorial career, mainly in light comedies.  It was noted in The Pittsburg Press in 1916 that her supportive role in Temptation was a "pronounced success". She started her solo director career in 1917 with her film “The Little Pirate” which released on September 10, 1917.

According to the reviews of the day, Wilson was a modest filmmaker, being best appreciated for eliciting good performances from otherwise indifferent talent. Her work was seen as artistic, enjoyable and popular in the film industry. Wilson featured as many female roles in her films and tended to appeal to child and female audiences. When writer Frances Denton of Photoplay visited Universal Studios in 1918, she described the work that Wilson was creating as “sob stuff” and was noticed as one of the female directors at Universal that created films centering around children. “The Game’s Up”, released in 1919, marked the end of Wilson's career.

Universal in the 1910s 

Historians noted Universal Studios for their feminist politics. Elsie Jane Wilson's case exemplifies how genre and gender, up until 1918,worked together to establish the institution's division of labor. Work and genres became gendered because the institution thought of gender in a particular manner. During this time, Universal was more hierarchal than collaborative. Moving Picture World began to identify such films as “woman’s features”, including Wilson's solo-directed films, separating “women” from the word “director”. This begins to exclude the women from the director's chair.

Contribution to cinema 
Early press established her as “front rank” of directors. Nevertheless, few women directors sustained careers in the 1910s. Actors on Julian's pictures later commented on how she came to set every day, often lightening the mood with jokes at Julian's expense to relieve tension.

In 1917, Wilson began advertising in The Weekly for members to take part in a café scene for her film “The Game’s Up”. During the same time period, the Board of Health shut down many Los Angeles restaurants due to an influenza epidemic leaving cabaret showgirls out of work. Wilson and Universal was addressed with a mob of showgirls trying to take part in her film.

In February 1918, Frances Denton wrote a story for Photoplay that addressed the normative femininity subordinate women in the name of equality. Denton presented Wilson as being a role model for the social standing of women.

Moving Pictures World, a weekly film industry periodical, often published on Wilson and her efforts in the silent film era. The Moving Picture Weekly recorded Wilson as Bluebird's noted woman producer. Her work played upon gender roles. In one of the films directed by Wilson, The Dream Lady (1918), the plot highlights gender visibility and insisting that gender is a performance.

Death 
 
Wilson survived her husband, who died in 1943. Wilson died in Los Angeles, California, at age 79, and was buried in the Forest Lawn Memorial Park Cemetery in Glendale, California alongside her husband. Much of Wilson's personal work has been destroyed over the century though her efforts have not gone unnoticed by the “Women Film Pioneers Project” and various other cinematic references from the times.

Selected filmography
 Bound on the Wheel (1915)
 Mountain Justice (1915)
 Temptation (1915)
 Oliver Twist (1916)
 The Mystery Ship (1917)
 The Little Pirate (1917)
 The Cricket (1917)
 The Silent Lady (1917)
 Mother O' Mine (1917)
 The Circus of Life (1917)
 The City of Tears (1918)
 The Dream Lady (1918)
 New Love For Old (1918)

References

Sources

1885 births
1965 deaths
American film directors
American silent film actresses
American women film directors
Australian emigrants to the United States
20th-century American actresses
Actresses from Sydney
Australian stage actresses
20th-century Australian actresses
Burials at Forest Lawn Memorial Park (Glendale)
Women film pioneers